Libraries in the Philippines, similar to libraries in other countries, come in one of the four basic types: academic, school, public, and special libraries. Prominent are academic libraries and the National Library of the Philippines, located in Manila. The university libraries of the University of the Philippines, the Central Philippine University, the Silliman University, the University of Santo Tomas, the University of the East, the Polytechnic University of the Philippines, Ateneo de Manila University, Far Eastern University and the University of San Carlos. Research institutes such as the International Rice Research Institute located in Los Baños, Laguna houses a library. Some museums in the Philippines such as the Lopez Museum have their own library.

About 1.2 million volumes of reference and reading materials are available at the National Library, in which the Filipiniana and Asia Division alone own more than 100,000 Filipiniana books. The Diliman portion of the library of the University of the Philippines is composed of 1,132,483 volumes. The University of Santo Tomas Miguel de Benavides Library contains 822,000 books. The Central Philippine University Library has 250,000+ volumes. The University of the East Library has 177,900 books. 160,000 volumes are deposited at the International Rice Research Institute.

See also
List of libraries in Metro Manila

References